Mark Cairns (born 21 June 1967) is a male former professional squash player from England.

Squash career
Cairns reached a career-high world ranking of World No. 7 in 1995. In 1997, he won the British National Squash Championships and teamed-up with Chris Walker to win the men's doubles title at the inaugural World Doubles Squash Championships. Cairns and Walker also teamed-up to win a bronze medal for England in the men's doubles at the 1998 Commonwealth Games in Kuala Lumpur.

Personal life
Mark currently lives in Oxfordshire, and works in property management. He has two children and lives with his wife.

External links 
 Profile at psa-squash.com

References

1967 births
Living people
English male squash players
Commonwealth Games bronze medallists for England
Commonwealth Games medallists in squash
Squash players at the 1998 Commonwealth Games
Competitors at the 1997 World Games
Medallists at the 1998 Commonwealth Games